Tilki is a Turkish language surname from a nickname meaning "fox" in Turkish. Notable people with the name include:
 Aleyna Tilki (2000), Turkish singer and songwriter
 Attila Tilki (1967), Hungarian jurist and politician

Turkish-language surnames
Surnames from nicknames